Dikesh Malhotra (born 7 June 1987 ) is a Nepali businessman, philanthropist, and the President and CEO of IMS Group. Malhotra is the only son of Sabita Malhotra and Nepali Businessman Deepak Malhotra, Chairman of IMS Group, and grandson of Dev Raj Malhotra. Malhotra's elder sister Dr. Deepika Malhotra is an Ophthalmologist and is currently working in Drishti Eye Care.

Early life 
Malhotra completed his schooling from Modern Indian School in 2005 and went to US to pursue his further education. While in the US Malhotra gained his work experience as he owned and operated two franchise restaurant (Jerry's Subs and Pizza) in Maryland, USA. He sold the two restaurants after graduation in 2011. Malhotra got married in February 2016 with Miss Nepal 2009, Ms. Zenisha Moktan and had a daughter, Dia on 25 December 2017. Malhotra is also the first cousin of famous female Nepali Actor Ms. Priyanka Karki. As per the Nepali calendar year 2071, Saptahik (a national weekly newspaper) announced Malhotra as one of the top 10 most attractive men. While many stay abroad after graduation, Malhotra returned home. He was interviewed by many medias and was also featured on the cover of various magazines and e-magazine for being inspirational and motivating the young entrepreneurs of Nepal to return to Nepal after pursuing further education in foreign countries. Malhotra also survived a major accident in March 2015 while returning from a business trip with his father and colleagues from Samsung. The Turkish Airline plane they were traveling on crash landed at  Tribhuvan International Airport after missing the runway. All the passengers and crew survived the accident and no one was injured or hurt.

Career 
He completed his bachelor's degree in Management from George Mason University, USA in 2011 and came back to Nepal to work for some time with IMS, also the national distributor of Samsung and then went to the UK and completed his MBA from the University of East Anglia in 2012. He joined business immediately after returning from UK after completing his MBA. During his stay in the United States, Malhotra established a corporation to purchase a franchise, Jerry's Subs and Pizza, in Maryland. Upon return to the country, he has been directing his efforts towards the company.

IMS is the national distributor for Samsung mobile phones in Nepal since 2001 and holds number one position in the mobile phone industry. IMS Group has also acquired the distributorship of SsangYong, a Korean automobile company in 2016. Under his leadership, the company claims to have doubled sales, minimized market outstanding and increased partner organizations. A new company HQ was established for employees which claims to have new departments and new communication channel was developed. He also initiated the change of the name and brand of IMS.

His efforts can be seen helping the youth with the help of the DM Foundation which he co-founded with his father. The DM Foundation is a non-profit organization working for the welfare of Nepal. It is currently focusing on granting scholarships to children without the resources to educate themselves.

He is the President & CEO of IMS Group. He is the Founder Director & CEO of DM Foundation. He is a member of the Nepal Chamber of Commerce. He is also the Vice-President of Nepal Bodybuilding and Fitness Association and a member of Entrepreneur Organization of Nepal.

About IMS Group 
Currently, IMS Group has 15 companies, including IMS, IMS Care, IMS Connect, IMS SMart, IMS Group, IMS Consultancy, IMS Motors, IMS Telecom, IMS Teletime, IMS Developers, IMS Energy, Silver Valley, Ashtanga Education, IMS Airport Services and IMS Agro. The brands partnered with IMS Group are Samsung, Ssangyong, DJI, Dr. Brown's, Crane, bbluv, Dreambaby, linearflux, Energizer, SWC, Geiger, Valentino Rudy and Kathmandu World School.

References 

1987 births
Living people
George Mason University alumni
Alumni of the University of East Anglia
Nepalese businesspeople
Nepalese philanthropists
People from Kathmandu
21st-century Nepalese businesspeople